Raymond Jude LeBlanc (born October 24, 1964) is an American former professional ice hockey goaltender. He is best known as the goaltender for the United States team at the 1992 Winter Olympics in Albertville, France. He was never drafted in the National Hockey League, but played a single game with the Chicago Blackhawks.

Biography
LeBlanc was born in Fitchburg, Massachusetts. After playing two seasons of junior hockey in Ontario, LeBlanc turned professional and joined the Pineridge Bucks of the Atlantic Coast Hockey League for the 1984–85 season. He then played one season for the ACHL's Carolina Thunderbirds before moving on to the International Hockey League, where he would spend the majority of his career. In his rookie season in 1986–87 with the Flint Spirits, LeBlanc appeared in 63 games and was awarded the Ken McKenzie Trophy as the top American-born rookie in the league.

LeBlanc played for the IHL's Flint Spirits, Saginaw Hawks, Indianapolis Ice, Fort Wayne Komets, Cincinnati Cyclones and Chicago Wolves during his career. LeBlanc spent the final two seasons of his career with the Jacksonville Lizard Kings of the ECHL and retired after the 1999–2000 season.

LeBlanc appeared in one National Hockey League game in his career, playing for the Chicago Blackhawks during the 1991–92 season. His appearance came to allow the Blackhawks to exploit a loophole in the NHL's rules for the 1992 NHL Expansion Draft, where each team had to expose a goaltender who had appeared in at least one game during 1991–92. LeBlanc was activated and placed into his only game on March 10, 1992, therefore meaning the Blackhawks would not have to expose any of their top three goaltenders: Ed Belfour, Dominik Hašek and Jimmy Waite. LeBlanc allowed only one goal, earning the victory as the Blackhawks defeated the San Jose Sharks, 5–1.

At the 1992 Winter Olympics, LeBlanc appeared in all eight games for the United States, compiling a record of 5–2–1 with two shutouts. The Americans finished out of the medals, however, as they lost 6–1 to Czechoslovakia in the bronze medal game.

Awards
 Ken McKenzie Trophy (best American-born rookie in the IHL): 1986–87 season

See also
List of players who played only one game in the NHL

References

External links

Ray LeBlanc @ hockeygoaltenders.org

1964 births
American men's ice hockey goaltenders
Atlantic Coast Hockey League players
Carolina Thunderbirds players
Chicago Blackhawks players
Chicago Wolves (IHL) players
Cincinnati Cyclones (IHL) players
Flint Generals players
Flint Spirits players
Fort Wayne Komets players
Ice hockey players from Massachusetts
Ice hockey players at the 1992 Winter Olympics
Indianapolis Ice players
Jacksonville Lizard Kings players
Kitchener Rangers players
Living people
New Haven Nighthawks players
Olympic ice hockey players of the United States
Sportspeople from Fitchburg, Massachusetts
Saginaw Hawks players
Undrafted National Hockey League players